Ino is an unincorporated community in the town of Keystone, Bayfield County, Wisconsin, United States. Ino is located at the junction of U.S. Highway 2, County Highway E, and Forest Road 236.

References

Unincorporated communities in Bayfield County, Wisconsin
Unincorporated communities in Wisconsin